The Romano-Serbian language is a mixed language (referred to as a Para-Romani variety in Romani linguistics) resulting from language contact between Serbian and Romani in Serbia and former Yugoslav countries and distinct from the Vlax Romani dialects spoken in Serbia.

Publications
In October 2005 the first text on the grammar of the Romani proper in Serbia was published by linguist Rajko Đurić, titled Gramatika e Rromane čhibaki - Граматика ромског језика (Gramatika romskog jezika).

References

South Slavic languages
Serbian language
Romani in Serbia
Para-Romani
Mixed languages
Languages of Serbia